Joseph Ephraim Casely Hayford,  (29 September 1866 – 11 August 1930), also known as Ekra-Agyeman, was a prominent Fante Gold Coast journalist, editor, author, lawyer, educator, and politician who supported pan-African nationalism. His 1911 novel Ethiopia Unbound is one of the earliest novels published in English by an African.

Biography
Joseph Ephraim Casely Hayford was born on 29 September 1866 in Cape Coast, in the British Gold Coast colony, now Ghana.

His family, part of the Fante Anona clan and descendants of a dynasty of omanhenes and okyeames, was part of the Fante coastal elite. His father, Joseph de Graft Hayford (1840–1919), was educated and ordained as a minister in the Methodist church, and was a prominent figure in Ghanaian politics. His mother was from the Brew family, descended from the 18th-century Irish trader Richard Brew and his African concubine. Brew settled in this area about 1745.

Casely was one of Joseph's middle names; he adopted Casely Hayford as a non-hyphenated double surname. His brothers were Ernest James Hayford, a doctor, and the Reverend Mark Hayford, a minister.

Early life 
Casely Hayford attended Wesley Boys' High School (now known as Mfantsipim) in Cape Coast, and Fourah Bay College in Freetown, Sierra Leone. While in Freetown, Casely Hayford became an avid follower of Edward Wilmot Blyden, the foremost pan-African figure at the time, who edited Negro, the first explicitly pan-African journal in West Africa.

Upon returning to Ghana, Casely Hayford became a high school teacher. He eventually was promoted to principal at Accra Wesleyan Boys' High School. He was dismissed from his position at the school for his political activism.

In 1885, he began working as a journalist for the Western Echo, which was owned by his maternal uncle James Hutton Brew. By 1888 Casely Hayford was the editor, and he renamed the paper as the Gold Coast Echo. From 1890 to 1896, he was co-proprietor of the Gold Coast Chronicle. He also wrote articles for the Wesleyan Methodist Times.

Inner Temple and the bar
In 1893, Casely Hayford travelled to London to study as a barrister at the Honourable Society of the Inner Temple, and at Peterhouse, Cambridge. He was called to the Bar on 17 November 1896. That year, he returned with his second wife Adelaide to Ghana to private law practice in Cape Coast, Axim, Sekondi and Accra. He also continued his work as a journalist, editing the Gold Coast Leader. In 1904, he helped found the Mfantsipim School. In 1910, he succeeded John Mensah Sarbah as president of the Aborigines' Rights Protection Society, the first anti-colonial organisation founded in the Gold Coast.

Political activism 

Casely Hayford wrote several books, primarily as commentary and opposition to land management acts issued by the colonial government, such as the Crown Lands Bill of 1897, and the Forest Ordinance of 1911. His view was that African identity and African social stability were inextricably linked to conservation of existing conventions concerning land rights.

In his 1903 book Gold Coast Native Institutions, Hayford analyzed Fanti and Asante governmental institutions, and argued for a self-governing Gold Coast within a federal greater Britain.

While visiting London to protest the Forest Ordinance of 1911, he was part of a group that gave financial assistance to Dusé Mohamed Ali to get his African Times and Orient Review off the ground. Others were Francis T. Dove and C. W. Betts from Sierra Leone and Dr. Oguntola Sapara from Lagos.

Casely Hayford was also deeply involved in the political movement for African emancipation. He corresponded with W. E. B. Du Bois, and participated in Booker T. Washington's International Conference on the Negro in 1912. Casely Hayford's correspondence with Washington fostered the pan-African movement in both Africa and the United States.

Casely Hayford's career in public office began with his nomination to the Legislative Council of the Gold Coast in 1916. As a legislator he served on various public commissions, and received an MBE in the 1919 Birthday Honours for services in aid of the Prince of Wales's Patriotic Fund. In the same year he formed West Africa's first nationalist movement, the National Congress of British West Africa, one of the earliest formal organisations working toward African emancipation from colonial rule. He represented the Congress in London in 1920, to demand constitutional reforms from the colonial secretary, and address the League of Nations Union. He was criticised for accepting inadequate concessions from the colonial authorities. While promoting an African nationalism that demanded unity and cultural awareness among Africans, Hayford advocated only constitutional political reforms within the framework of Ghana remaining a colony. He became the first patron of the West African Students' Union in 1925, and was elected as municipal member for Sekondi in September 1927. The National Congress was dissolved shortly after Casely Hayford's death in 1930.

He published a novel entitled Ethiopia Unbound (1911), which is one of the first novels in English by an African. It has been cited as the earliest pan-African fiction. The novel is set in both Africa and England. It relies on philosophical debates between an African and his English friend, as well as references to contemporary African events and ancient African history, to provide a context for its exploration of African identity and the struggle for emancipation.

Marriage and family
Casely Hayford was the progenitor of the Casely-Hayford family of Ghana and Britain. His descendants have served as part of the latter country's Black British elite. 

He was first married to Beatrice Madeline Pinnock. The couple's son Archie Casely-Hayford became a barrister, district magistrate and the first Minister of Agriculture and Natural Resources in the First Republic of Ghana.

While in London studying at the Inner Temple and lodging at a hostel for African bachelors in 1893, Casely Hayford met Adelaide Smith, a lady of Sierra Leonean Creole origins. They later married, and she returned with him to the Gold Coast in 1896 after he was received by the bar. She became a prominent writer and established a Freetown girl's vocational school. Adelaide and Joseph had a daughter, Gladys May Casely-Hayford (1904–1950), who was a teacher, an artist and a poet, publishing some of her poems under the pen name of Aquah Laluah.

Bibliography 

The Truth About The West African Land Question (1898. Reprinted, 1913. Reprinted London: Frank Cass, 1971)
Gold Coast Native Institutions: With Thoughts Upon A Healthy Imperial Policy for the Gold Coast and Ashanti (1903. Reprinted London: Frank Cass, 1970)
Ethiopia Unbound: Studies in Race Emancipation (1911. Reprinted London: Frank Cass, 1969, . Black Classic Press, with an Introduction by Molefi Kete Asante, 2011)
Gold Coast Land Tenure and the Forest Bill (1911)
William Waddy Harris, the West African reformer (1915)
United West Africa (1919)
West African Leadership: Public speeches delivered by the Honourable J. E. Casely Hayford; edited by Magnus J. Sampson (1951)

References

External links 
 Thoemmes Continuum – The History of Ideas: Writings of Ekra-Agiman (J. E. Casely Hayford)

1866 births
1930 deaths
20th-century novelists
African newspaper editors
Alumni of Fitzwilliam College, Cambridge
Alumni of Peterhouse, Cambridge
Fante people
Fourah Bay College alumni
Ghanaian Methodists
Ghanaian novelists
Ghanaian pan-Africanists
Ghanaian people of English descent
Ghanaian people of Irish descent
Ghanaian politicians
Ghanaian schoolteachers
Ghanaian writers
Members of the Order of the British Empire
People from Central Region (Ghana)
J.E.